The 2008–09 Scottish Second Division was the fourteenth season of the Second Division in its current format of ten teams.

Promotion and relegation from 2007–08

First & Second Divisions
Relegated from First Division to Second Division
 Stirling Albion

Promoted from Second Division to First Division
 Ross County
 Airdrie United (losing play-off finalists, promoted due to Gretna's demotion to Third Division)

Second & Third Divisions
Relegated from Second Division to Third Division
 Berwick Rangers
 Cowdenbeath (via play-offs)

Promoted from Third Division to Second Division
 East Fife
 Arbroath (via play-offs)
 Stranraer (losing play-off finalists, promoted due to Gretna's demotion to Third Division)

League table

Results
Teams play each other four times in this league. In the first half of the season each team plays every other team twice (home and away) and then do the same in the second half of the season.

First half of season

Second half of season

Top scorers

Source: The League Insider

Attendances

Source:The League Insider

Managerial changes

Monthly awards

Second Division play-offs

Semi-finals
The ninth placed team in the Second Division played the fourth placed team in the Third Division and third placed team in the Second Division played the second placed team in the Second Division. The play-offs were played over two legs, the winning team in each semi-final advanced to the final.

First legs

Second legs

Final
The two semi-final winners played each other over two legs, the home team in the 1st Leg was determined by a draw conducted on 16 April 2008. The winning team were awarded a place in the 2008–09 Second Division.

First leg

Second leg

References

Scottish Second Division seasons
2008–09 Scottish Football League
3
Scot